Charles W. Hunt may refer to:

 Charles Wallace Hunt (1813–1911), American mechanical engineer, inventor and business executive
 Charles W. Hunt (politician) (1864–1938), Iowa politician and Federal Trade Commission chair
 Charles W. Hunt (educator), American educator and academic administrator

See also
 Charles Hunt (disambiguation)